Martin Staehelin (born 25 September 1937) is a Swiss musicologist and university lecturer.

Life 
Born in Basel, Staehelin first studied ancient languages, history, school music and flute. In 1967 he received his doctorate in musicology and ancient languages as minor subjects.

After his Zurich habilitation on the composer Heinrich Isaac, Staehelin first became director of the Beethoven Archive and Beethoven House in Bonn before being appointed professor of musicology at the University of Göttingen in 1983.

Since 1987 he has been a full member of the philological-historical class of the Göttingen Academy of Sciences and Humanities. In 2013 he gave the laudation for the award of the Lichtenberg Medal to Joshua Rifkin. In 1993 he was appointed honorary director of the Johann Sebastian Bach Institute in Göttingen. Since that same year he has been a member of the Academia Europaea in London and since 1998 member of the advisory board of the Prussian Cultural Heritage Foundation in Berlin.

Publications 
 Die mittelalterliche Musik-Handschrift W1: Vollständige Reproduktion des ‘Notre Dame’-Manuskripts der Herzog August Bibliothek Wolfenbüttel Cod. Guelf. 628 Helmst. Wolfenbütteler Mittelalter-Studien 9. Harrassowitz, Wiesbaden 1995, .
 Ein unbekannter Brief von Ulrich von Wilamowitz-Moellendorff an Felix Staehelin über die 'Geschichte der kleinasiatischen Galater'''. In: Klio. volume 76 (1994),  
 Musikwissenschaft und Musikpflege an der Georg-August-Universität Göttingen: Beiträge zu ihrer Geschichte. Göttingen: Vandenhoeck & Ruprecht, 1987. . 200 pages.
 "Pierre de La Rue," in The New Grove Dictionary of Music and Musicians, ed. Stanley Sadie. 20 vol. London, Macmillan Publishers Ltd., 1980. 
 Die Messen Heinrich Isaacs: Quellenstudien zu Heinrich Isaac und seinem Messen-Oeuvre. 3 vols, Publikationen der Schweizerischen Musikforschenden Gesellschaft. Bern - Stuttgart: Haupt, 1977.

 References 

 Further reading 
 Ulrich Konrad (edit.): Musikalische Quellen – Quellen zur Musikgeschichte''. Studies in honour of Staehelin on his 65th birthday. Göttingen 2002.

External links 
 Staehelin Martin in WorldCat
 
 Martin Staehelin on the website of the University of Göttingen
 Martin Staehelin on the website of the Göttingen Academy of Sciences and Humanities

Swiss musicologists
20th-century musicologists
Music historians
Bach scholars
Beethoven scholars
Academic staff of the University of Göttingen
Members of Academia Europaea
1937 births
Living people
People from Basel-Stadt